Thaumatomonas is a genus within Imbricatea of the phylum Cercozoa.

It includes the species 
 Thaumatomonas coloniensis Wylezich et al. 2007
 Thaumatomonas constricta Scoble & Cavalier-Smith 2014
 Thaumatomonas hindoni (Nicholls 2012) Scoble & Cavalier-Smith 2014
 Thaumatomonas lauterborni de Saedeleer 1931
 Thaumatomonas oxoniensis Bass & Cavalier-Smith 2011
 Thaumatomonas seravini Mylnikov & Karpov 1993
 Thaumatomonas solis Scoble & Cavalier-Smith 2014
 Thaumatomonas vancouveri Cavalier-Smith & Chao 2011
 Thaumatomonas zhukovi Mylnikov 2003

References

Imbricatea
Cercozoa genera